Willacoochee is a city in Atkinson County, Georgia, United States, along the Alapaha River. The population was 1,391 at the 2010 census.

History
The Georgia General Assembly incorporated Willacoochee as a town in 1889. Willacoochee is a name derived from the Creek language meaning "home of the wildcats".

Geography
Willacoochee is located at  (31.335175, -83.046381).

Demographics

2020 census

As of the 2020 United States census, there were 1,240 people, 529 households, and 291 families residing in the city.

2000 census
As of the census of 2000, there were 1,434 people, 526 households, and 369 families residing in the city. The racial makeup of the city was 49.79% White, 39.40% African American, 0.49% Asian, 8.65% from other races, and 1.67% from two or more races. Hispanic or Latino of any race were 15.76% of the population.

There were 526 households, out of which 35.2% had children under the age of 18 living with them, 46.0% were married couples living together, 18.6% had a female householder with no husband present, and 29.7% were non-families. 26.4% of all households were made up of individuals, and 11.6% had someone living alone who was 65 years of age or older. The average household size was 2.68 and the average family size was 3.22.

In the city, the population was spread out, with 30.3% under the age of 18, 11.2% from 18 to 24, 27.3% from 25 to 44, 19.7% from 45 to 64, and 11.6% who were 65 years of age or older. The median age was 31 years. For every 100 females, there were 91.5 males. For every 100 females age 18 and over, there were 86.2 males.

The median income for a household in the city was $20,871, and the median income for a family was $25,536. Males had a median income of $21,603 versus $17,115 for females. The per capita income for the city was $9,301. About 23.6% of families and 29.7% of the population were below the poverty line, including 37.6% of those under age 18 and 35.0% of those age 65 or over.

In media

In The Steve Harvey Show, gym teacher Cedric Jackie Robinson's mother owned land in Willacoochee.

In the movie Renaissance Man, Mark Wahlberg's character, "Tommy Lee Haywood," was from Willacoochee, mispronounced as "Wallahoochie" by Danny Devito's character. 

In the movie Jungle Fever, Rev. Purify (played by Ossie Davis), Flipper Purify's (played by Wesley Snipes) father, makes reference to being born in Willacoochee. 

In the movie Beauty Shop, a customer, Mrs. Towner made a reference to Willacoochee while spelling out her name. Humorist Lewis Grizzard talked about the No Name Bar in Willacoochee. 

In Love Victor, high school students Victor Salazar and Benji Campbell (played by Michael Cimino (actor) and George Sear, respectively) took a road trip to Willacoochee to have an espresso machine repaired by a shop in Willacoochee, which was the only place they could repair this specific espresso machine.

Photos

References

External links
 City of Willacoochee official website

Cities in Georgia (U.S. state)
Cities in Atkinson County, Georgia